The Horse-Devil and the Witch or The Horse-Dew and the Witch is a Turkish fairy tale first collected by Hungarian Turkologist Ignác Kúnos in late 19th century.

The tale belongs to the international cycle of the Animal as Bridegroom or The Search for the Lost Husband, wherein a human princess marries a supernatural husband, loses him, and goes on a quest to find him. According to scholars and local folktale catalogues, the supernatural husband may appear in the shape of a horse in Turkey and nearby regions.

Sources
The story was first published by folklorist Ignác Kúnos in Hungarian as A ló-ördög és a boszorkány and in German as Der Ross-Dew und die Hexe.

Translations
The tale also appears in German as Der Dew in Rossgestalt ("The Horse-Shaped Dev").

The tale was also translated into English as The Horse and the She-Devil, and The Princess, the Horse and the She-Devil.

Summary

Before he travels afar, the padishah orders his daughters to groom his favorite horse. The eldest daughters are rebuffed by the animal, and only the third daughter is able to groom and feed it. Her father notices their approximation and marries her to the animal. She discovers the horse is actually a human at night and promises to be quiet about it.

When her father organizes a tournament, the horse husband takes off his horse skin and joins it, eventually defeating and unhorsing his brothers-in-law. This repeats for the second day of the tournament. On the third day, the horse husband gives her three strands of his hair to his wife to summon him whenever she may need help. He goes to the tournament. Proud of his deed and cajoled by her sisters' endless mockery, the princess betrays his secret and he disappears.

She seeks him out and reaches a mountain. She burns one of the hairs he gave her and he appears. They embrace and he tells her this mountain is the abode of his witch mother and she may kill her. So, to protect her, he transforms her into an apple to hide her inside his mother's house.

The ogress mother finds her and she is forced to do some tasks for her: to sweep and not sweep, and to fill 3 vases with her tears - which she accomplishes with her husband's guidance. The princess and her husband at last escape from the witch by transforming into objects, their last transformation a tree (the princess) and a serpent coiled around it (the horse prince).

Analysis

Tale type
The tale belongs to the cycle of stories classified in the international Aarne-Thompson-Uther Index as ATU 425, "The Search for the Lost Husband", and subtypes related to the Animal as Bridegroom cycle.

Motifs
According to Christine Goldberg, some variants of the type show as a closing episode "The Magic Flight" sequence, a combination that appears "sporadically in Europe", but "traditionally in Turkey". As their final transformation to deceive the ogress mother, the princess becomes a tree and her supernatural husband becomes a snake coiled around it.

According to Richard McGillivray Dawkins, variants with the horse as the animal husband were found in the Balkans, in Turkey and among the Romani from Bulgaria. Likewise, scholar  asserted that the animal or supernatural husband appears as a horse in tale type 425A (see footnote "a") "in the Orient".

Turkologist Iya Stebleva Vasilyevna, by comparing Turkish tales Çember-Tiyar and Bileiz, suggests a mythic approximation between the horse and the deva (Turkish: div).

Variants

Turkey
In the Typen türkischer Volksmärchen ("Turkish Folktale Catalogue"), by Wolfram Eberhard and Pertev Naili Boratav, both scholars listed the variants with the horse husband under one type: TTV 98, "Der Pferdemann" ("The Horse Man"), which corresponded in the international classification to tale type AaTh 425. In a later book, Boratav stated that the Catalogue registered 25 variants, but six more had been collected since its publication.

In most of the variants collected, the supernatural husband is a horse, followed by a man with a donkey's head and a camel. In other tales, he may be a snake, a frog or even Turkish hero Kaloghlan.

Shah Bender
Turkologist Ignác Kúnos published a tale titled Шаһ Бäндäр ("Shah Bender"), in the 8th volume of Vasily Radlov's Proben der volkslitteratur der türkischen stämme. In this tale, translated by Johannes Østrup as Shah Bender, three princesses cast their lot with apples, in a contest to find their husbands. The youngest throws hers and it lands near a donkey. They marry and the donkey reveals he is a prince named Shah Bender, and warns his wife that she must not share their secret. The next day, he takes part in his father-in-law's tournament as a mysterious knight and defeats his opponents. Out of pride, the princess tells her family the knight is her husband. He vanishes. She seeks him out and finds an ogress, who gives her a walnut and sends her on her way. The event happens twice more, and she gains a lemon and a pomegranate. One day, the princess reaches a kingdom with three castles, a servant comes out of each of them and she bribes them with the fruits to spend a night at the castle. She also cleans a bloodied shirt. Her mother-in-law begins to mistreat her: she forces the girl to sweep the floor on penalty of death, and to fill a kettle with her tears. Finally, Shah Bender's mother betrothes him to another girl and forces the princess to bear ten candles tied to her fingers. Shah Bender notices her fingers are burning, but she answers it is her heart that is. Shah Bender tosses the candles on the false bride, rescues his princess and both escape in a transformation sequence. The third and final form they shapeshift into is a cypress (the princess) and a seven-headed monster (Shah Bender).

Çember-Tiyar
In another variant, published by folklorist Pertev Boratav (fr) with the title Çember-Tiyar (Tschember-Tiyar), a sultan with three daughters marries the two elders to human princes. As the youngest is still single, she is the only one to give grapes to their favorite horse and the only one he responds to affectionately. The sultan marries his third daughter to the horse, who is an enchanted prince. She promises to keep his secret. On a tournament, the horse prince appears in red vestments on a red horse and defeats his brothers-in-law, and on the next day on white garments. She betrays the secret and burns the horse skin. The enchanted prince becomes a dove and flies away. The princess follows after him and reaches the house of an ogress (a dev), his mother, who orders her to perform difficult tasks for her, including sweeping and not sweeping the floor, getting a sieve from a distant neighbour, filling a teapot with her tears and filling mattresses with bird feathers. Finally, Çember-Tiyar's mother betrothes him to another girl; on the wedding day the ogress mother ties the princess to a pole and places ten wax candles on her fingers and one on her head. As she begins to be set on fire, Çember-Tiyar replaces her for his bride and the couple escape in a "Magic Flight"-type sequence, by throwing objects behind them, and lastly, by turning the princess into a tree and Çember-Tiyar into a snake coiled around it.

At Koca
In this tale, a judge has three daughters and a horse that eats only hazelnuts and roasted raisins. However, the animal looks emaciated and sick. A doctor states that it is in love, so the remedy is to find him a bride. The horse chooses no human maiden, but the judge's youngest daughter. They marry and she discovers he is a human prince named Tahir Bey. Tahir tells her that, when she goes to the bath house, to endure the any mockery her sisters and friends may throw her way for marrying an animal. Nevertheless, one day she decides to tell them he is an enchanted prince, and for them to see him with their own eyes. The horse overhears her words, and returns to his homeland. When she returns home, her husband has disappeared. She goes on a quest for him, first accompanied by a regiment of soldiers, then on her own. Finally, she reaches a plain with two houses, one of gold and the other of silver. She talks to a coming servant who is getting water for their master (Tahir), and the judge's daughter drops her ring in the water jug. Tahir notices the ring and brings his wife to his house. He warns the judge's daughter that his mother is a Dev (in the German translation; ogress in the English translation) that may devour her, but manages to tame his mother long enough to introduce the human to his mother. The next day, Tahir's mother gives the girl a sieve of onions and orders her to peel and not to peel them. The second day, the Dev-mother gives her a bowl of laundry and orders her to wash and not wash it. Tahir Bey advises his wife what to do. Wanting to get rid of his daughter-in-law, the ogress sends the girl to the ogress's sister to retrieve a flute and a drum - a trap set to kill the maiden. Tahir Bey gives his wife a ring, and tells her to leave it on a desk, exchange the animals' fodder (hay for a cow, bone for a dog), get the instruments while his aunt is away and flee. Lastly, the Dev-mother places a cousin of Tahir's in place of the judge's daughter and forces the human girl to stand behind a door, be quiet, and hold candles on her fingers, otherwise the Dev will devour her. The judge's daughter's fingers begin to burn as the candles melt in her hands, and she cries. Warned by his true wife's wails, Tahir Bey notices his mother's deception, places the candles on his cousin's finger, and takes his human wife away from his mother. The Dev-mother enters the room and notices that her son escaped, jumps onto a jug and rushes after him. On her pursuit, Tahir Bey and his human wife transform themselves in objects: first, into a fountain (the girl) and a jug (Tahir); an orchard (the girl) and a gardener (Tahir); a bride (the girl) and a priest (Tahir). Their last transformation is into a tree (the girl) and a snake coiled in its branches (Tahir). The Dev-mother stops by the tree, Tahir turns back into a human and kills his mother. Free at last, Tahir takes his human wife back to her father.

The Princess and the Red Horse Husband
In a tale collected by Barbara K. Walker with the title The Princess and the Red Horse Husband, a padishah summons his three daughters to plan their weddings: they should stay at the palace's balcony and throw a golden apple at their prospective husbands. The elder sisters are betrothed to humans; the youngest throws a ball and hits a red horse. She repeats the action, with the same results. She marries the red horse. That night, he reveals he is human, after all, but begs her to stay as a horse during the day and not to reveal anything to her sisters, for he is "the fairy giant king's son". One day, her sisters mock her again for her strange choice of husband, and she, fed up, decides to show them the truth, by having them spy on him through a keyhole. The sisters convince her to burn his horse skin; he becomes a dove and flies away. She asks her father to fashion a pair of iron shoes and decides to go after him. After a hole is made in her iron shoes, her husband appears and turns her into an apple, to bring it to his mother's house. He hides her for some time, but one time advises her to nurse from his giant mother's breasts when she is kneading dough. She does and his mother warms up to her. Her son (Shah Selim) comes up with a false story that the princess is their maid, now that he is to be married to his cousin. The giant mother orders her to fill mattresses with feathers, and to go to the aunt's house to get the bread griddle. Her husband, Shah Selim, advises her on both occasions: in his aunt's house, she must open a closed door, feed correctly a horse and a dog, take the griddle and escape from the house. At last, the Shah Selim's wedding comes, and, after the ceremony, his giant mother forces the princess to bear ten candles, one on each finger, for the whole night near the married couple. Shah Selim advises her to wait until the candles have melted enough and to smear it on the bride's face. She does and the couple escape on a pair of horses. His father notices his son's absence and chases after the couple; Shah Selim and the princess transform into things to trick the pursuer. Finally, they turn into a  stick and a snake coiled around it. This time, Shah Selim's mother arrives and, seeing the objects, hesitates, for she might hurt her son. So she returns home and lets them be.

The Girl and the Horse
In a Turkish tale collected by Russian philologist  with the title "Девушка и конь" ("The Girl and the Horse"), a padishah asks his daughters to look after his favourite horse. Only the youngest is able to give water and food to the animal. Seeing the relationship between both, he decides to marry one to the other. The girl comes to live in the stable with the horse, who is the son of a deva. At night, the stable becomes a palace for them. One day, the horse assumes human shape and joins his brothers-in-law in a game of throwing darts. The princess's sisters mock her for her animal husband and praise their human spouses. On the next day, the horse prince gives three tufts of hair to his wife. On the third day, fed up with the incessant mockery, she reveals the truth about him and he disappears. The princess decides to go after him. One day, she reaches the foot of a mountain, burns one of the hairs and summons her husband. He comes to her and tells her his deva family lives in that mountain. He turns her into an apple and takes her into their home. He makes his mother promise not to harm her and shows her his wife. The deva mother forces the girl to do chores: to sweep and not sweep, and to fill two vases with her tears. The last task for her is to bake a pie, even though she cannot find any ingredient in the house. They decide to escape and his family pursues them. The princess and her husband disguise themselves as different objects to elude them: first, into a bath house (her) and a bath house guard (him); then, into a spring (her), while he assumes another appearance with a jar in his hand; lastly, into a tree (her) and a dragon coiled around it (him). The tale was also classified as Turkish type TTV 98 (see above), with the episode of "The Magic Flight" (ATU 313).

The Stone of Patience
In a Turkish tale translated into Russian language as "Камень терпенья" ("The Stone of Patience"), war breaks out between two kingdoms, and a padishah is worried that, with the deaths of many young men, he might not be able to secure husbands for his three daughters: Snow-white Rose (or Silver Girl), Crimson Rose and Golden Rose. One day, the girls stroll in the garden, and lament over the fact that, despite their beauty and grace, something is still missing. The gardener overhears them and advises the following: each is to pluck a similarly coloured rose from a rosebush (representing each daughter), place it on a platter with a pomegranate, and send a slave dressed in similar clothes with the platter to a person named "Черный дядька" ("Black Old Man"). The "Black Old Man" divines the girls' intention and explains to the padishah they want to be married.

The padishah decides to set a test: shoot three silver arrows at random at three different directions; whatever they land, there they shall find their husbands. The youngest's arrow lands in a mountain named Kafadagi, just before the realm of the divs. The padishah's wife gives her daughter a stone of patience and sends her on her way. The princess finds her silver arrow in the middle of nowhere, and weeps for her sad fate, but the stone of patience tells her to wait and have patience. Trusting the stone's advice, she finds a hidden trapdoor, with a fireplace inside. She makes herself at home, and goes to find food. She fails, but sees a golden pheasant with some herbs in its mouth. She thinks about hunting the bird, but lets it be. The next day, the golden pheasant takes off its wings and becomes a human knight. He introduces himself as Kojabey, and wants to befriend the princess. He summons a crystal palace, which the princess believes to be a mirage, a magic trick at first, but trusts Kojabey and enters. After they sit in a room, the princess tells her story to Kojabey, and the man reveals he comes from a land famous for its jigits, he comes from a family of wizards, and he changes forms from day to day. They fall into a routine: Kojabey is an animal by day in the vastness of the desert, and at night becomes a man and spends time with the princess in the magical palace. After a few years and 40 days, a messenger named Keloglan visits the princess bearing good news: her sisters have given birth to her nephew and niece, and her father is holding a festival to celebrate the occasion. The princess and Kojabey agree to go to the festival.

Kojabey turns into a pigeon and is carried by the princess to her kingdom. The princess goes to meet her sisters, who mock her raggedy clothes. The princess tries to save face and lies to them that her husband is a merchant. The princess then spends the night in the stables with the pigeon-shaped Kojabey, who tells her that he will take part in the equestrian competition to teach her sisters a lesson: in the first day, he comes as white rider on a white horse; in the second, as a golden knight; and on the third, as a blue knight. During the three days competition, the mysterious jigit defeats the others, to the crowd's amazement. Although she promised Kojabey to keep his secret; the princess, fed up with her sisters' mockery, reveals the knight in blue is her husband. Suddenly, a bloodied dove perches near her, berates her action, and tells her to find him wearing seven iron shoes and an iron cane. She travels high and low for Kojabey, and stops to rest by a fig tree. The ground opens and two dwarven appear, one black-haired and the other white-haired, and comment about Kojabey's illness, and the only cure: water from the Fountain of the Silent Ones. The princess finds the fountain, says a prayer and takes the water with her.

She reaches Kojabey's country and cures him with the water. After curing him, she is treated as a guest of honour in his house, but his mother listens to a secret conversation between the girl and Kojabey, and learns she was responsible for her son's suffering. Kojabey's mother then forces the princess on tasks for her son's upcoming wedding to his cousin: first, she is to build a mill in the Beshkkaya rock; then, to sweep the rooms, fill mattresses with feathers, and pots with honey and oil. Kojabey guides her in fulfilling the tasks. Next, his mother orders her to go to a tellibey, her nephew, who lives in a mountain near Karadag, and get from him a 40-string saz. Kojabey instructs the princess: she is to compliment two rivers (Mysmyl and Mundar) filled with poisonous water; walk in thorns and pretend they are rose petals; compliment an owl by saying it is a nightingale, talk to his cousin and wait until she gets the saz. She follows the instructions and retrieves the instrument. During the wedding ceremony, the princess pours out her woes to the stone of patience, which bursts apart from her anguish. Kojabey enters her room and decides to escape with her. He shapeshifts into an eagle and takes the princess on his wings.

As they fly through the air, they are pursued by his relatives. To elude their pursuers, they shapeshift into a spring (the princess) and a golden ladle (Kojabey); then into a rose garden (the princess) and a garden-keeper (Kojabey); and finally into a rosebud (the princess) and a yellow snake coiled around it (Kojabey). His mother tries to persuade him to come back with her, but Kojabey, still in snake form, confesses that he taught his wife the secrets of the peris and the patience of the divs; she taught him to cry and laugh like a human being; that by "adding a human soul" into their lineage, they can become humans, and that he prefers that fate instead of living like a semi-human. His mother takes it all in, gives her blessing to their union, and asks Kojabey to be henceforth named Sabur-Khan ("King of Patience"), and his wife Sabur-Khatun ("Queen of Patience"). This tale was classified by Hungarian ethnographer Ákos Dömötör as Turkish type EB 98.

The Spotted Deer
In a tale translated by folklorist  with the title Der gescheckte Hirsch ("The Spotted Deer"), originally published by Ali Rıza Yalgın, a padishah has three daughters. Each of the princesses orders the Wasir to give a melon to their father, to see their marriageability. The padishah, then, summons every man and youth from the kingdom to the palace, so that his daughters can choose their husbands by throwing apples. The elder two throw theirs and find two Wasir sons as bridegroom, and the youngest throws hers to a person named Keloğlan ("Bald-Headed"). The youngest throws her apple again, and again it falls near the same person, so they believe he is her destined mate. They marry. After they enter the bridal chambers, the youth takes out a feather and shakes it. He becomes a young man. The princess asks him about his origins, and he answers he is called Alageyik ("spotted deer", "fallow deer"), the son of the Dev-mother ("Dewenmutter") from Mount Kâf; his mother is the Sultana ("Sultanin") Tepegöz, who rules over 18 mountains; and tells her not to tell the secret, lest he vanishes and she has to seek him.

One day, the padisah becomes ill, and his doctor prescribe he should drink deer milk to cure him. So his three sons-in-law are sent for the cure, Keloglan on a lame mule, and the other two on fine horses. Keloglan burns a feather, teleports to Mount Qaf, gets the deer milk and brings it to his father-in-law. The other two sons-in-law bring milk that is either too sweet, or to bitter, but the milk Keloglan brought heals the king. Later, the padishah organizes an equestrian game with javelins, and a mysterious youth takes part in the festivities, amazing the padishah with his prowess. The youngest princess reveals her husband's secret. For this, her husband does not return home at night, and she decides to seek him out with iron shoes and an iron cane.

The princess passes by the Copper Palace by the Copper Mountain, where no one knows the "Emir of Mount Kâf" (her husband), and by the Silver Mountain, where she is directed to the land of the Dews, in Mount Kâf. The princess stops by a fountain in a village. Meanwhile, her husband, the Emir, goes to fetch water from the fountain, and sees his wife. He turns her into a ball of yarn and brings it to his house, where he announces to his mother that he found a maidservant in need of work.

The next day, his mother, who is a man-eating creature, gives the princess a broom decorated with pearls and gemstones and commands her to sweep a room. The princess gets the broom, but it "dissolves" in her hands. Her husband comes to her, uses a feather and the broom sweeps the room. The next day, the Dev-mother orders the princess to fill two vases with her tears. The Emir tells her to mix salt in water. On the third day, the mother orders the princess to go to her sister and get from there some musical instruments for her son's upcoming marriage. The Emir instructs the princess: close an open door and open a closed one; give the grass to a horse and meat for the dog; drink from a fountain of blood and wash her face in a fountain of pus; enter his aunt's house and, while she is away sharpening her teeth, get the bright box and flee. The princess follows the instructions to the letter and brings it to the Dev-mother.

Finally, the Dev-mother decides to marry her son, the Emir, to another Dev-woman. That same night, the Emir takes his human wife and flies away on a flying jug. His mother goes after him in another. The Emir sees her and turns his wife into a poplar tree and himself into a snake coiled around the tree. The Dev-mother tells the pair he wants to give her son a kiss; the Emir, metamorphosed into a snake, spits venom at his mother's mouth and bites her tongue, and she dies. The Emir and his human wife return to her father's kingdom, where they learn the padishah died, but wanted his third son-in-law to ascend to the throne after him.

The Padishah's Little Daughter and the Horse at the Stables
In a tale from Serik, published in 1961 in the journal Türk Folklor Araştırmalar ("Turkish Folklore Studies") with the title Padişahın Küçük Kızı ve Tavladaki At ("The Padishah's Little Daughter and the Horse at the Stables"), a padishah has three daughters, and each announces their suitors: the elder wants to marry the vizier's elder son, the middle one the vizier's youngest son, and the youngest a horse at the stables. Despite some mockery, she is dead set on her choice and takes care of the horse, grooming it and feeding it grapes. The story then explains that the horse is in fact the son of the Queen of the Peris, who cursed her son to become a horse for seven years. One day, the time of the curse expires and the horse changes into a youth right in front of the princess's eyes. The youth calms her by explaining he was the horse, changed into that state by his mother's spell. He then asks her to accompany him back to the land of peris. The princess gleefully accepts and flies with him to his mother's house. After they land, the Queen of the Peris greets her son and asks him who is his female companion, a human. To avoid his mother's anger, the youth spins a story that he brought the girl as a female servant to work as a turkey-herd for them.

After seven years, the Queen of the Peris is preparing her son's wedding to a female peri - the reason why he was cursed in the first place - and orders the human girl to fill jars with her tears, since the wedding guests drink salt water at the ceremony, while the rest of them take part in the wedding procession. The youth excuses himself and rushes to the princess to teach her how to fulfill the task: sprinkle salt in the water. Next, the Queen orders the girl to fill mattresses with bird feathers. The youth leaves the procession again and gives the princess a feather; she is to burn it to summon all birds, which will give her their feathers. Lastly, the procession arrives, and the Queen lights ten candles on the princess's fingers, for her to hold them all night. All the while, the peri youth is reading a book, and his bride enters the chambers. Some time later, while his peri bride is asleep, he takes the candles from the human princess's hands and tosses them on his bed, then turns into a horse and rides away with her. Back to the bride, she burns to death in a fire that also destroys the castle. The Queen of the Peris sends her sisters after them, but the youth and the princess disguise themselves as a farmer and a field, and a mason and wall to fool their pursuers. Finally, the Queen herself goes after them, and they turn into a sapling (the princess; "fidan", in the original) and a black snake (the youth; "kara bir yılan", in the original). The Queen menaces them, but, seeing the snake coiled around the tree as to protect it, she leaves them be and gives them her blessing. The youth and the princess return to her kingdom, where they marry.

Other tales
Eberhard and Boratav summarized a tale from Sivas that is classified as ATU 432, "The Prince as Bird", but its ending sequence follows type ATU 425B, "The Son of the Witch" (or TTV 98). In this tale, the heroine, at a gypsy woman's request, asks her father to bring her a candlestick as a returning gift; the candlestick serves to summon the mysterious prince; the heroine's jealous elder sisters place glass shards to hurt the prince; the prince flies back home and the heroine goes after him; she overhears the conversation between two giants, kills them and takes their ashes to cure the prince. After she cures the prince, his mother sets her on difficult tasks: to sweep the floor, collect many feathers and get a sieve from a distant house. After the tasks, the heroine is almost burned to death during the prince's wedding night, but they escape in a Magic Flight sequence, their last transformation being a tree and a snake.

From the Uysal-Walker Archive 
The Uysal–Walker Archive of Turkish Oral Narrative also collected two other variants with the horse husband. In one, The Padisah's Youngest Daughter and Her Donkey-Skull Husband, collected in 1970 from teller Niyâzi Çam, from Bursa Province, the padishah assembles everyone in the palace courtyard for his three daughters to toss their apples to choose their husbands. The third daughter tosses hers and it lands near a donkey skull. She marries the donkey skull and, inside the nuptial chambers, her husband reveals he is a handsome youth, but asks her never to spill the secret, lest he disappears and she has to quest for him. Life goes on for both, and the princess visits the public bath for women. There, she is mocked for marrying a donkey skull. One day, fed up with the mockery, reveals to the other women the true nature of her husband, who knocked on the door to the bath house to reprimand his wife. He tells her she may never find him again, even if she walks with an iron cane and wearing a pair of iron shoes, and vanishes. She decides to seek him out, and wears a pair of iron shoes. She reaches the Pearl Mountain, the Gold Fountain and the Diamond Fountain, where her husband lives in a mansion. They reunite, but he warns her that his mother is a giant that may devour her, so he changes her into a broom to hide her from his mother. The next day, he asks his mother not to hurt a padishah's daughter if she comes by; his mother agrees and he changes the broom back into his human wife. The giantess forces the human princess to sweep or not sweep her house, to fill 40 cauldrons with her tears, and to climb the mountain, enter another mansion and get her a closed box. The husband advises the princess to drink from a fountain of bitter liquid and compliment it, to eat a sour pear from a tree and compliment it, close an open door and shut an open one, change the food of two animals for the correct ones (meat for a lion, grass for a horse), get the box and escape. She does all that and climbs down the mountain, but curiosity gets the better of her and she opens the box; "wild music" starts to leak from the box, until her husband appears to close it again. The princess delivers he box to the giantess mother. That night, the couple decide to escape from the mansion, while his family follows them. First, they transform into a minaret and a mosque, then a sheep and a flock of sheep, and lastly a poplar tree (the princess) and a snake atop the tree (the prince). His mother comes to the tree; the snake asks her for a kiss and spits venom into her mouth. The princess and her husband return to her kingdom.

In a second tale, The Trials of the Padişah's Youngest Daughter, collected in 1976 from teller Mehmet Karakaş, from the Urfa Province, the padishah's three daughters buy watermelons that represent their marriageability: the first melon is overripe, the second half-overripe and half-edible, and the third just right. Seeing this, their father arranges for them to throw apples at their prospective suitors from a balcony. The third does not toss hers, and tells her father her suitor stationed his horse near the palace. They take the horse to the stables. A parade of young men passes in front of the palace, but her suitor apparently isn't there. She goes to the stables and pets the horse, who tells her that she must hide him for three Fridays, otherwise he will disappear. Her sisters' weddings occur on the next two Fridays, and during the festivities a mysterious young man appears and wins the games, who the princess recognizes as the horse. On the second occasion, the princess tells her sisters the young man is the horse, then cries over her decision. The next day, the horse vanishes, and a little bird lands on her shoulder, telling her she will find him after she wears down a pair of slippers and an iron cane. She wanders through a copper well house, a silver fortress and a gold fortress. In the gold fortress, she sees a girl fetching water from the well and begs for a drink, in the name of Emirilâm. The servant gives her the jug and the princess drops her ring inside it. Her groom recognizes the ring and brings the princess in, but he warns his is a family of giants, and shrinks her size to hide her from them. The youth hides her for three days and on the fourth she appears, since the giants cannot harm her after three days. Now at a normal size, the giantess mother forces the girl to do some chores in preparation for her son's wedding to his cousin: to gather downy feathers for the marital bed; and to bring her "the song and the word". The youth advises her on both occasions: to get the song and the word, she must enter the forest and give the correct food for two animals (meat to the dog, and grass for the horse), switch the positions of two carpets (one hanging on the wall, the other lying on the ground); enter a palace, get the box and do not open it. She follows his instructions, but she opens the box: violin players and tambourine players leap out of it, but the horse youth, Emirilâm, locks them inside the box. Finally, Emirilâm's wedding is here: his giant mother ties the princess to a tree in the courtyard and sets a fire at the foot of the tree. Emirilâm finds and unties the princess, and both escape in a cloud of smoke. His giantess mother pursues the couple, who disguise themselves as a pool and a fish. The giantess mother fails in finding them, and explodes in anger. Emirilâm and the princess reach her father's kingdom and marry.

Other regions

Europe

Greece
Italian author  published a Greek variant from Calabria with the title Il bel Cavallo (Greek: To máñon álogo, English: "Handsome Horse"), in journal La Calabria – Rivista di Letteratura Popolare. in this tale, a childless couple prays to God to give them a son, even it is  a horse, so a horse is born. Just three days after being born, the horse asks his parents to find him a wife. They first bring him daughters of poor people, whom he kills. Finally, he is married to a suitable bride. He tells her his parents will throw a party; she will be there and he will come wearing blue garments; he will kiss her and, although his mother will beat her, she is not to reveal the man is their son. This happens two more times; him wearing green garments on the second time and white garments in the third time. The girl tells them the man is their son, the horse, but they only find the horse skin. Some time later, the girl looks for him with 7 iron canes and reaches the house of a Maga, who threatens to devour her, but her daughter takes her in as a servant. She then forces her to separate a mix of barley and lentils. Il bel Cavallo sees her and offers his help in exchange for a kiss; she declines, but he still helps her by summoning ants to separate the grains. Next, the Maga orders her to wash, rinse and dry a pile of clothes, then fill a mattress with bird feathers, and get the musical instruments from the house of the Maga's sister. Il bel Cavallo warns her that as soon as she enters the Maga's sister's house, the daughter will be by the oven; the human girl is to toss the daughter into the oven, get the musical instruments from under the oven and escape. She follows the instructions and gets the instruments, but, when she reaches the Maga's house, she lets the instruments escape from her hands. Il bel Cavallo places it into her hands. Finally, the Maga marries Il bel Cavallo to a cross-eyed woman, and forces the girl to hold two candles at the foot of the bridal bed. Richard McGillivray Dawkins reported the same tale, which he translated as Handsome Horse: the girl is married to an enchanted prince named Handsome Horse, who disappears "after the Cupid and Psyche manner". Afterwards, the girl finds him again, in his mother's house, an ogress. The ogress betrothes her son to a witch's daughter, and forces the girl to do impossible tasks.

Bulgaria
The horse-prince as the enchanted husband also appears in the Bulgarian tale corpus, under tale type 425B, "Момъкът с конската глава" or "Der Junge mit Pferdekopf" ("The Youth With the Horse's Head").

In a Bulgarian Romani variant, E Batiméskeri Paramísi ("The History of Batim"), a king owns a horse, which is the son of an ogre. One day, the servant who grooms it notices that when the horse saw the eldest daughter of the king, it became enamoured, and it won't eat its rations. The king orders his daughters to line up in a queue, to be given leblebi with nuts and to feed the horse with it; the animal only eats from the eldest's apron. They marry. The princess is despondent at first, but the horse takes off his equine disguise and becomes a man. He tells her that he will appear the next day as a fine knight with green garments and horses, and that she must not tell her sisters anything; otherwise, she will have to search for him in the land of Čine-ma-čine-džéza-davúlja. She obeys at first. The day after, he appears on a white horse and she lets her family in on the secret. He disappears, and she goes after him with shoes of iron and a staff of iron. She arrives at the land of Čine-ma-čine-džéza-davúlja, and stops by a fountain. She sees a servant fetching water and asks her to whom it is the jug; she answers it is for Batim (the horse's name). She drops her ring inside the jug and the servant brings the jug to Batim, who recognizes the ring. The princess meets him again, but he warns that his mother will eat her, and turns her into a pin to protect her. Batim asks his ogress mother to swear on his name not to harm her, and he shows her his human wife. The ogress mother forces her to do difficult tasks: to fill a tank with tears, to fill 41 rooms with feathers and let half remain over, to invite the ogress's sister and her brothers for a wedding feast - all accomplished with her husband's guidance. Lastly, Batim and his wife escape from the ogress by turning into objects to fool her. The third time, Batim turns into a flower and the wife into a rose-bush. The ogress comes to the rosebush and hesitates, for she might pick one or the other and hurt her son. She concedes defeat and lets her son live with his human wife.

In a tale from the Turkish population of Vidin, Bulgaria, "Дочь падишаха и Билеиз" ("The Padishah's Daughter and Bileiz"), a padishah is going on a trip, and asks his daughters to look after his horse and feed him dry oats. The horse only responds to the youngest. When the padishah returns, he learns of the horse's affectionate treatment of his third daughter and marries them. After the wedding, the girl begins to cry, but the horse takes off the horse skin and reveals he is a human named Bileiz. The next day, he appears as a knight in red garments on the padishah's tournament, and on the day after in black clothes. In case anything happens to him, he gives his wife a signet ring as a token. She tells to her family the knight is the horse, and he disappears. She then decides to go after him, by wearing an iron amulet and using an iron cane. She reaches a fountain, with an inscription nearby: "Bileiz". She sees a servant girl fetching water and begs for some to drink. She drops the signet ring on the servant's jar. Bileiz finds his wife, takes her home and explains his mother is a seven-headed deva and might devour her. His mother appears and smells human flesh, but Bileiz spins a story about hiring the girl as another maid. So, the deva mother forces her to sweep half of the floor and not sweep the other half, to cook half of the meat and not cook the other half, and go to a relative of the deva to get a plank and some bread dough. Finally, the deva mother orders her to carry ten candles on her fingers during Bileiz's marriage to another bride. The padishah's daughter vents to her husband about his mother, and he tells her he planned their escape: when she is holding the ten candles, she must drop them and jump on a winged horse, while he rides a normal one. It happens as he describes. While on the run, his deva relatives come after them in the shape of a fog. They transform into a minaret and a muezim, a watermelon and a gardener, a snake and a rosebush. Bileiz's sister hesitates in cutting either the snake or the rosebush, and returns home.

In a Bulgarian tale translated into Hungarian with the title A vasruhás cárkisasszony ("The Tsar's Daughter with Iron Garments"), an old woman takes a czar's son as companion. One day, the youth wants her to ask for the tsar's daughter's hand in marriage. However, the tsar wants the youth to perform some tasks first: to erect a crystal palace that opens and closes on its own; a garden where it is raining, it is sunny, the birds sing and the trees bloom by themselves, and to build bridges across all lakes and rivers overnight. The tsar consents to their marriage. They marry and live with the old woman. One day, the tsar invites his daughter and son-in-law to his palace. The son-in-law takes with him a giant horse's head that he carelessly deposits somewhere in the palace. The servants, who were baking bread, see the horse's head and throw it in the oven. The prince warns his wife that the horse's head should not have been burnt, and that he will disappear; if she ever wants to find him again, she must wait 9 years, then ask for iron garments, iron shoes and an iron cane to be made; finally, she must always journey towards the sunrise, and look for him, "Öreg". Time passes and she goes on a journey: she visits three old women with giant spinning apparatuses and their cannibal sons, who direct the princess to Öreg. She reaches a well, where Öreg's nine servants and nine slaves come to fetch water. The princess begs for a drink and drops her ring in a jug. Öreg recognizes the ring and takes the princess into his castle as a servant. His mother suspects something amiss between her son and the girl. One day, Öreg is to be married to another woman; the man and the princess conspire to torch the bride's veil to cause a distraction during the wedding. The princess becomes a bridesmaid; when everyone is kissing the bride's veil, she asks to kiss it too, and torches the veil with a candle. Öreg and the princess escape from the wedding, but his family comes after them. The pair transforms into a lake (the princess) and a duck (him); a melon orchard (the princess) and a park-keeper (him), and finally a blackthorn bush with a thorny branch (the princess) and a giant grass snake wrapped around it (him). His mother ceases her pursuit and lets them be.

Caucasus Mountains

Rutul people
In a variant collected from the Rutul people, in Dagestan, with the Russian title "Как ослик Ризван превратился в юношу" ("How donkey Rizvan becomes a youth"), a couple have no son, so his wife prays to God for a son, and she gives birth to a donkey. One day, the donkey son wants to marry the princess, and his human mother convinces the king to accept the proposal. However, the padishah orders his prospective son-in-law to perform a few tasks first, which he does and marries the princess. On the wedding night, the donkey son reveals his true form to his human wife: he is a human named Rizvan beneath the animal skin. The widow convinces the princess to hid her husband's donkey skin out of his reach, so that the old woman can burn it. She follows through the instructions and her husband loses her donkey skin. He becomes a bird and tells his wife that, if she ever wants to see him again, she must look for him in a distant kingdom. The princess searches for him for years, until she reaches a fountain, where a slave woman is carrying water to Rizvan. The princess begs for some water to drink, and drops her wedding ring inside the jug. When the slave woman takes the water jug to Rizvan, he recognizes his wife's ring and brings her in. Together at last, they decide to escape from the castle in a Magic Flight sequence, with a creature named azhdaha hot in pursuit.

Ossetian people
In a tale from the Ossetians titled "Злотокудрый юноша" ("The Golden-Haired Youth"), an Aldar announces his intentions to marry his three daughters. The two elders find suitable husbands for them, while the youngest points to a lame and lousy horse grazing at the edge of the village. She marries the horse, and, at night, the horse takes off his skin to become a golden-haired youth, but, in the morning,wears the horseskin again. This goes on for some time, to the girl's grief. She consults with a кулбадагус ("kulbadagus"), who advises her to burn the horseskin. The girl lights a fire and tosses the animal skin to burn it. Her husband awakens, admonishes his wife, turns into a bird and flies away. Time passes, and the girl is grieving for her lost husband, when she sees a raven fly over. She asks the raven if it saw a golden-feathered bird. The raven says it didn't. Later, she asks a swallow, which also does not know, and finally a sparrow. The sparrow tells her it saw the golden-feathered husband, and that she can go to where he is by baking three honeycakes and praying to God to change her into a sparrow. The girl follows the instructions, turns into a bird, and, guided by the little bird, reaches a distant house. The sparrow says it must depart, but before it leaves, it advises the girl to enter the house where her husband is and to toss her ring into his jug. The girl turns back into human, enters the house and sees her husband; she tosses her golden ring inside the jug and hides. The husband wakes up, sees the ring in the jug, and beckons three times for his wife. She appears after the third call. The husband warns her that his mother, a creature with large tusks, will eat her, and bids her to hide. The mother enters the room and tells the golden-haired youth to show her where the girl is, since she can smell her. The youth makes his mother promise on her nameless sister not to harm his wife. The girl is introduced to her. Some time later, the mother forces her to clean their large house, by weeping over the floor then sweeping. Her husband tells her to sprinkle the floor with saltwater first. The mother then goes to sleep. The youth takes a dagger and kills the creature. Several skulls (from her victims) roll around the place. The youth takes a whip and cracks it against the skulls to resurrect the slain people. The youth explains that the creature was not his mother, but a witch who turned him into a lame horse.

Armenia
In a 1979 article, researcher  noted that the supernatural husband appears as a donkey in at least two Armenian tales, related to tale type AT 425.

Scholars Isidor Levin and Uku Masing published an Armenian tale titled Herr Amir. In this tale, a lonely old couple complain that they have no one to care for them in their old age. However, the old man opens the door to their house and finds a young donkey ("Eselsjunges") in front of their balcony. The little donkey invites himself in and explains to the couple he is actually a youth underneath the donkeyskin. He proves his story by taking off the skin and becoming a human youth, then becoming a donkey again. One day, he asks his adoptive mother to ask for the hand of the king's daughter in marriage. The king consents to their marriage, but orders the suitor to build a house that overshadows the king's palace, then to extend a carpet between the palace and the house, with blooming trees alongside it, so that they can make shade for the princess, and lastly for the suitor to appear with an army of one hundred knights in one hundred horses of a white colour. The donkey-child advises his human mother to go to the garden and, in name of Herr Amir (the donkey's name), ask for each task to be done. Eventually, the king's daughter marries the little donkey. One day, she asks him what she can do about the skin; Herr Amir answers that she may burn the donkeyskin to make hm human, but then he will have vanished and she will not see him again, unless she walks with steel shoes and with a steel cane. One day, the king's other daughters visit her sister and comment that their husbands are better than hers, the donkey. Angry at their mockery, the princess takes the donkeyskin and burns it, then her husband appears to her sisters in human shape. At midnight, Herr Amir gives her one last kiss, then vanishes. The princess asks her father for steel shoes and a steel cane and begins her quest. Meanwhile, Herr Amir goes back to his true parents, and begins to yearn for love for his human wife so much that he burns with fever. His sisters then go to a nearby spring to fetch water to cool him down. The princess then, after a long journey, notices that her steel shoes are worn out, and hopes that her husband is somewhere nearby. She then sees two women fetching water in jars, and asks them the reason for it. The women explain that the water is for Herr Amir, who is burning with fever. The princess asks for a drink and drops her ring in a jar. The women bring the jugs to their brother and Herr Amir, noticing his wife's ring, asks his sisters to bring in the girl at the fountain. Herr Amir finds his wife, and she lives with him under his parents' roof, until, one day, his mother asks him about the woman that he brought home. Herr Amir dismisses her concerns, and plans with his wife their escape. On the road, as the pair is being pursued by his family, they turn into a mill (the princess) and a miller (Herr Amir) to deceive his father, then into a garden (her) and a gardener (him), and finally into a rose tree (her) and a snake coiled around its trunk (him) to trick his father and mother. Herr Amir's father ceases his pursuit and lets the pair be, then goes back home. Herr Amir and the princess return to her kingdom, celebrate a new wedding and become king and queen.

Asia

Western Asia 
According to researcher Samia Al Azharia Jahn, the supernatural bridegroom may appear as a horse, a goat or a camel in Arab variants.

Israel
Professors Yoel Shalom Perez and Judith Rosenhouse report an archival Jewish-Spanish tale from the Israel Folktale Archives (IFA). In this tale, titled The Camel Prince, a princess is married to a camel that becomes a man at night and remains an animal during the day. One day, the camel prince fights in a war to protect his father-in-law's kingdom and the princess betrays his secret, prompting his disappearance. The princess goes on a quest and does find him, but in the land of demons. There, the queen of demons takes the princess as a servant and orders her to perform some tasks, including getting a sieve by going to another demon's house. The queen of demons weds her own daughter to the camel prince, and forces the princess to dance with candles at the ceremony. However, the princess throws the candles at the demon bride and escapes with the camel prince. To delay their pursuers, the princess and the camel prince shapeshift into objects: a farmer and a plow, a baker and an oven, and a mosque and a muezzin.

India
Author M. N. Venkataswami collected an Indian variant from Nagpur, Central India, with the title Jambhu Rájá, first published in the Indian Antiquary. In this tale, a king has a dream about a horse - a good omen, he believes. Intent on making it a reality, he goes to the marketplace and buys a spirited horse. He brings it to his stable, but the animal refuses to eat his fodder, except in the presence of the king's daughter. The king consults the dice, and marries her to the horse. At night, the horse, named Jambhu Raja, takes off his horse-covering and becomes a man. His wife notices his transformation and one day burns his horse skin. He passes his days doing good deeds. One day, his wife is visited by her sisters (in disguise), who tell her to ask her husband his name. He warns her not to do so, but she insists. He goes to the margin of a river, tells his name and disappears back to his parents' kingdom, and suffers an intense burning sensation. The princess goes on a quest for him. One day, she rests by a tree, and overhears two chakwi chakwa birds conversing about a cure for Jambhu Raja: get their dung and grind it to powder. Next, she reaches a fountain where waterbearers are fetching water and taking it to Jambhu Raja to cool him down. The princess puts her ring into a jug that is taken to the prince, enters the palace and cures her husband. However, his mother forces the princess on dangerous tasks: to plaster with cow dung their dwelling place (made to bristle with sharp needles and conjuring by magic scorpions and centipedes); to wash a dirty sari; to winnow three khandis of grain (done with the help of ants); and give a letter to the house of the prince's new bride (with a command to kill the girl). Jambhu Raja foils his mother's every attempt on his wife. The day comes when his mother prepares his wedding to another wife, and the princess is made into a torch-bearer. She complains to Jambhu Raja that her cloth is on fire, and he rescues her back to their palace. This story was also classified as a Horse-Husband type of tale.

Iran
In an Iranian tale collected by Arthur Christensen with the title Grünkappe ("Green Cap"), a fisherman catches in the sea with his net a fine foal. He brings it home and hides it from his seven daughters in a room. He feeds it with candies and gives the leftovers to his daughters. One day, the fisherman leaves the room and takes the candies with him. his daughters take the chance to spy into the room. They enter and see a foal in the corner of the room. The seven sisters fight among themselves to have the horse, thinking it a gift from their father. In the fracas, the horse pulls the youngest over to him, despite her protests, and her six sisters leave her in the horse's room. The fisherman returns and sees his youngest daughter in the room with the horse. The horse then asks the man to marry his daughter. The man is doubtful about the proposal: "A horse for a husband? What will people think?". The horse explains he belongs to the race of the Peri, ran away from there due to a fight, and fell in love with the human girl. Herzveloren marries him, and is endlessly mocked by her sisters. One day, the horse, named Grünkappe, tells his wife not to cry, for he is a handsome youth beneath the horseskin, since his own mother, who is from the race of the Dîwe, cursed him into that state. He also makes a deal with Herzveloren: he can take off his horseskin at night to become a man, if she can keep the secret between them. One day, she reveals to her sisters that her husband is a man by night and a horse by day, and her sisters, jealous of her good luck, goad her into asking Grünkappe how to burn his horseskin. Herzveloren insists to know the answer, and Grünkappe tells her the horseskin can be burnt in pistachio peels and onion peels. Herzveloren burns his horseskin. Grünkappe warns her that only misfortune awaits them, gives her a ring, and tells her to seek him with seven pairs of iron shoes in the land of Peri and Divs. She reaches her mother-in-law's house, and, drained by the long journey, rests by a spring. A slave comes to fetch water and Herzveloren drops her ring into the slave's jug. Grünkappe is informed about the woman at the spring and goes to check on her; his wife Herzveloren sees him and embraces him, her journey at an end. However, her husband takes her in to his mother and his wife is forced to perform chores for her: to wash a black piece of cloth white and black again. Grünkappe's mother then sends Herzveloren, her true daughter-in-law, to her sister under false pretences: to get a pair of scissors for the upcoming wedding, but she is sending the human to be devoured by the aunt. Herzveloren goes to the Dev's sister to get the scissors. Once there, the Div-aunt goes to another room to sharpen her teeth. The Div-aunt's child, from her cradle, advises Herzveloren to get the scissors and escape, for its mother is preparing to eat the human. Later, Grünkappe is forced to marry his cousein, and his Diwe mother places ten candles on Herzveloren's fingers. The human girl complains to her husband that her fingers are burning, and Grünkappe can only answer her that his heart is also burning. At the end of the tale, the pair escapes from his mother and, as a last trick on her, turn into grains of corn, while the witch becomes a chicken. Eberhard and Boratav noted, in the introduction to their book, that the tale Grünkappe was parallel to the Turkish type 98 (see above). Professor , in his Catalogue of Persian Folktales, classified Grünkappe as Iranian tale type AaTh 425B, Der Tierbräutigam: Die böse Zauberin ("The Animal Bridegroom: The Evil Sorceress"). He also established that Iranian tale type 425B corresponded to Turkish tale type 98 (see above), of the Typen Türkischer Volksmärchen.

Uzbekistan
Author Gabriele Keller collected an Uzbek variant titled Chötiktscha or Xo’tikcha (German: Eselkind; English: "Donkey-Child"). In this tale, the titular Chötiktscha is no normal animal: he falls in love with the padishah's daughter and asks his old lady owner to act as his Sovtschi and ask for her hand in marriage. Despite her reservations, the old lady goes to the padishah's palace doors and, after a few days, is invited in to discern the reason for her visit. After divulging her reasons, the padishah rebuffs the woman's proposal. Still, the old woman insists and the padisah agrees, but first her donkey must perform some tasks: to brings a herd of lambs, oxen, camels and horse, and to have cooking oil flow between their doors as if through a path. He does and marries the princess in a grand ceremony, and the princess goes to live with the donkey. One day, the princess's mother pays a visit to her daughter, and she tells that her husband is no donkey: he takes off the donkey skin at night and becomes a handsome youth, a Peri, and wears the donkey skin again in the morning. The princess's mother tells her that her father lives with shame for her choice of husband, and urges her daughter to burn the donkey skin. Her husband learns of this and forbids her from burning the donkey skin, for she will never see him again, until she has worn out a cane to the size of a needle, and shoes to be like a sieve. Despite his protests, the princess takes the donkey skin and burns it. The man laments the fact, becomes a pair of doves and flies away. The princess's mother tries to comfort her by saying she can have any other man, but the princess proclaims she needs no one else, and begins her quest dressed as a dervish. She then journeys far and wide to get him back. She reaches an oasis where she rests by the shade of a tree, and notices both the cane and the shoes are worn out. She then sees a child (a girl) carrying an "Oftoba" (a water jug) to fetch water. The princess asks the girl whom the water is for, and she says it is for her brother. The princess places her ring in the water jug, and the girl brings it to her brother. Her brother, the princess's husband, notices the ring and asks his sister to bring the dervish in. He recognizes the dervish as his wife. The story explains that the princess's mother-in-law is a Dev. The princess's husband hides her from his mother by turning her into a broom, but later introduces her as his wife, and makes his mother promise not to devour the princess. Some time later, the Dev-mother orders the princess to go to her Dev sister and bring back a pair of scissors. The princess's husband advises her: she is to pass by a broken bridge and compliment it, pass by a stream of blood named "Qonjiring" ("blood-stream") and compliment it, pass by a squeaking mosque named Ridscha and compliment it, pass by a fallen door and compliment it, trade the animals' fodder (plate for the dog, jug for the stork), meet his cousin "Olti-Emtschak" ("The Six-Breasted One") and give her tools (an armguard and a handguard) to help her clean the tandir oven; delouse his aunt in the clay terrace ("Supa"), tie her hair around the terrace, get the scissors and flee. The Dev-aunt commands her daughter, the animals, the door, the mosque, the stream and the bridge to stop her, but the princess escapes. The Dev-aunt pays a visit to her sister and they plan to eat the princess that same night. At last, Chötiktscha takes his wife, and some objects (a comb, a mirror and grains of salt), and both escape, the Dev-family in pursuit. Chötiktscha throws behind him the salt to create a mountain, the comb to create a thornbush and a mirror to create a river between them. The Dev-relatives ask how he crossed the river, the Chötiktscha suggests his mother and his aunt put some stones in their pockets and cross it. The Dev-relatives sink to the bottom of the lake. Chötiktscha and his human wife go back home and live happily ever after. Keller classified the tale as type AaTh 425B, "Die Aufgaben der Hexe (Hexensohn)" ("The Witch's Tasks (Son of the Witch)"), and Turkish Type TTV (EB) 98, "Pferdemann" ("Horse as Husband"), with elements of type AaTh 480 (helping and complimenting inanimate things on the way to the second witch) and conclusion as type AaTh 313, "The Magic Flight".

Central Asia
Gabriele Keller argues that type TTV 98, "Pferdemann" (see above), is also "verbreitet" ("widespread") in Central Asia.

Scholar Isidor Levin translated and published a tale collected from a Tajik informant in Üratübe, modern day Istaravshan. In this tale, titled Sultan-scheckiger Hund ("Sultan Spotted Hound"), a man lives with his daughter. One day, the daughter enters a room and sees many flies buzzing around a youth lying there. She spends 39 days in this vigil, and buys a slavewoman to cover for her for a few hours, while she goes to comb her hair. The youth awakes on the 40th day and mistakes the slavewoman to be his saviour. The youth takes the slavewoman as his bride and the other girl as a servant. Later, he goes to a bazaar and buys a dress for his bride and a marble stone to the girl. The girl pours out her woes to the marbie stone, and the youth, who is a prince, discovers the truth and weds the girl. Some time into their marriage, the prince tells that he becomes a man at night and a hound during the day. The girl, now his wife, tells his secret to the people and burns the dogskin. He vanishes and she goes after him. She finds him again and is taken to his stepmother's house. The sultan's stepmother gives her two large pots and orders her to fill both with her tears. Her next task is for her to wash a piece of black felt white. Thirdly, the Sultan's stepmother sends the girl to her sister. The sultan asks her about this task and advises her: his wife is to go through the gates, exchange the correct fodder for the animals (clover for the horse, bones for the dog), wait to see if the aunt is asleep, then get a mirror, a comb and a whetstone. The girl gets the objects and brings to the Sultan, who was waiting for her. The sultan's aunt commands the door to stop her, to no avail. The sultan and his wife escape from his stepmother and her sister as quickly as they can, both sorceresses in pursuit.

Literary variants
Author Shahriar Nafici published a Persian language tale obtained from his mother. In this tale, Sheep's Head, in the town of Make Believe, a childless couple wants a son, but no such luck. A man gives the woman a remedy and she gives birth to a baby with a sheep's head. The old man tries to get rid of the sheep by dropping it on the well, but it survives and lives with the couple. Years later, the baby with the sheep's head wants to marry, but his parents ask him who could marry a person with his characteristics. He eventually marries a human princess named Maleknâz, the seventh daughter of a king, who has been having dreams about a mysterious and handsome prince. On the wedding night, Sheep's Head takes off his animal disguise and reveals he is a handsome youth named Malek Mohammad,  born to the "king of the angels" and cursed by his mother for refusing to marry her sister's daughter. In regards to their marriage and the breaking of the curse, he explains that princess Maleknâz must bear humiliation and mockery from her sisters until forty days have passed, then Malek Mohammad's curse will be broken and he can assume human form permanently, since his "apparent" human parents failed in keeping him inside their house for the same period of time. Maleknâz bears each day their endless mockery, with her husband's support and life lessons, but she ends up breaking his trust. Disappointed, Sheep's Head gives her instructions on how to find him: she shall wear pairs of shoes made of "pure metal" (or iron), walk with seven walking sticks, go through seven cities and learn several important lessons, then she may find him. On her way, she finds Malek Rouh, a blacksmith who claims to be Malek Mohammad's father. She finally reaches the palace of her mother-in-law in the town of demons. Malek Mohammad finds her and explains that his mother is a cannibal and a "demon". He turns her into a brooch to hide from his human-eater mother and makes her promise not to eat Maleknâz. Some time later, his mother sends her to empty a flooded area using only a sieve. Her husband helps her with a magic trick. She continues to force impossible tasks on the princess, like counting stones in the desert or emptying a basin with a thimble. One of the last tasks she forces upon the princess is to be naked, cover herself in candles and dance at the upcoming wedding of Malek Mohammad and his cousin. At the wedding, Maleknâz dances while the wax from the candles melts all over her body. A sudden gust of wind blows open the doors and snuffs out the candles to save Maleknâz. A ball of light comes in and takes the princess away from the demons and into the Town of Knowledge. Maleknâz recognizes her saviour: her father-in-law.

See also
 The King of Love
 Prince Wolf (Danish fairy tale)
 Tulisa, the Wood-Cutter's Daughter (Indian fairy tale)
 The Golden Root (Italian fairy tale)
 Habrmani (Armenian folk tale)
 Khastakhumar and Bibinagar
 The Son of the Ogress (Kabylian folk tale)
 Yasmin and the Serpent Prince
Baemsillang (The Serpent Husband)
Amewakahiko soshi

Footnotes

References 

Turkish fairy tales
Fictional princes
Fiction about shapeshifting
Female characters in fairy tales
ATU 400-459